HMS B6 was one of 11 B-class submarines built for the Royal Navy in the first decade of the 20th century. The boat survived the First World War and was sold for scrap in 1921.

Design and description
The B class was an enlarged and improved version of the preceding A class. They displaced  on the surface and  submerged. The B-class submarines had a crew of two officers and thirteen ratings.

For surface running, the boats were powered by a single 16-cylinder  Vickers petrol engine that drove one propeller shaft. When submerged the propeller was driven by a  electric motor. They could reach  on the surface and  underwater.

The boats were armed with two 18-inch (450 mm) torpedo tubes in the bow. They could carry a pair of reload torpedoes, but generally did not as they would have to remove an equal weight of fuel in compensation.

Construction and career
B6 was built by Vickers at their Barrow-in-Furness shipyard, launched 30 November 1905 and completed 3 March 1906.

In July 1914, B6 was based at Gibraltar. Following the outbreak of the First World War she was employed in patrolling the Straits of Gibraltar. B6 was deployed to the Eastern Mediterranean for service during the Gallipoli Campaign. On 17 April 1915, the submarine  attempted to break through the Dardanelles in order to attack shipping in the Sea of Marmara. E15 ran aground and her crew were forced to abandon ship, so later that day B6 unsuccessfully attempted to torpedo E15 to prevent Turkish attempts to salvage the stricken submarine.

In August 1915 B6 and sister ship  were sent to Alexandria in Egypt, arriving on 13 August, to deter Turkish attempts to smuggle supplies to Bedouin tribesmen. The two submarines had orders to patrol off Sollum, but were found to be unsuited to this duty, being too small and having too short a range and so were withdrawn from the operation.
 
In October 1915 B6 was one of six B-class submarines deployed to the Adriatic Sea to support the Italian Navy. It was hoped that the short range of these old submarines would be less of a problem in the confined waters of the Adriatic. In November, the flotilla commenced operations out of Venice. While the B-class submarines proved to be more seaworthy than Italian submarines, operations were hampered by extensive use of mines in the Northern Adriatic.

In 1917 the Italian Navy converted B6 into surface patrol boat S6 to serve in the Adriatic. The boat was sold in 1921 to Messrs. Francotosti, Malta.

Notes

References
 
  
 
 
 
 
 
 

 

British B-class submarines
World War I submarines of the United Kingdom
Ships built in Barrow-in-Furness
Royal Navy ship names
1905 ships